Peter Simon may refer to:

 Peter Simon the Younger (1750–c. 1810), English engraver, one of the engravers who worked on The Seven Ages of Man
 Peter Simon (actor) (born 1943), American actor
 Peter Simon (presenter), UK television presenter
 Peter Simon (businessman), founder of London-based Monsoon Stores Ltd (1973)
 Peter June Simon (born 1980), Filipino basketball player
 Peter Simon (politician) (born 1967), German politician

See also 
 Simon Peter, apostle
 Peter Simons (disambiguation)